The Tenafly Nature Center is a non-profit member-supported nature preserve. Its mission is the stewardship of nearly 400 wooded acres for the purposes of conservation, education and recreation. It is located at 313 Hudson Avenue, Tenafly, New Jersey, in Bergen County.  It sits on top of the Palisades, a rock formation in northeastern New Jersey overlooking the Hudson River. Within this natural tract are more than seven miles of trails, several streams, and Pfister's Pond.  There is also a visitors' center with live animals, nature exhibits and a library for members.   A Butterfly and Pollinator Garden showcases pollinator-attracting flowering plants.
  
The forest is predominantly upland oak, with other deciduous trees and shrubs. In the spring, native wildflowers can be seen, such as trout lily; mayapple; spring beauty; and common blue violet, New Jersey's state flower.  Green frogs, bullfrogs, painted turtles, garter snakes and many species of migratory and native birds can be seen at the pond.

Programs available to the public include guided hikes, making maple sugar, bird walks, and making apple cider. Tenafly Nature Center run's school programs for K-12 as well as summer and vacation camps, scout programs, birthday parties.

External links 

Tenafly Nature Center's home page
Borough of Tenafly, New Jersey

Nature centers in New Jersey
Buildings and structures in Bergen County, New Jersey
Protected areas of Bergen County, New Jersey
Tenafly, New Jersey
Tourist attractions in Bergen County, New Jersey
Education in Bergen County, New Jersey